Galatasaray SK Wheelchair Basketball 2007–2008 season is the 2007–2008 basketball season for Turkish professional basketball club Galatasaray SK.

The club competes in:
 IWBF Champions Cup
 Kitakyushu Champions Cup
 Turkish Wheelchair Basketball Super League
 Sinan Erdem Cup

2007-08 roster

Squad changes for the 2007–2008 season 

In:

Out:

Results, schedules and standings

Turkish Wheelchair Basketball Super League 2007–08 

Pts=Points, Pld=Matches played, W=Matches won, L=Matches lost, F=Points for, A=Points against

Regular season 
First Half

Second Half

Play-offs 
Quarter-Finals

FINALS

IWBF Champions Cup 
Qualifying round

Galatasaray was qualified.

Final Group 
Final Groups

Group Matches

Semi-Final

FINAL

Kitakyushu Champions Cup 2008 

FINAL

Friendly Games

Sinan Erdem Cup 
Galatasaray won the cup.

FINAL

References 

Galatasaray S.K. (wheelchair basketball) seasons
2007–08 in Turkish basketball by club
2007 in wheelchair basketball
2008 in wheelchair basketball
Galatasaray Sports Club 2007–08 season